Niemierzyn  is a village in the administrative district of Gmina Ostrówek, within Wieluń County, Łódź Voivodeship, in central Poland.

The locale's designation derives from the Slavic given name Niemir.

References

Villages in Wieluń County